Nicholas P. Miller (b. circa 1995) is an American politician and businessman. He is a Democratic member of the Pennsylvania State Senate, representing the 14th District since 2023.

Early life and education
A native of Allentown, Pennsylvania, Miller is the son of Lehigh County Court of Common Pleas Judge Michele Varricchio. He graduated from Allentown Central Catholic High School in 2013 and then attended Pennsylvania State University, where he earned a bachelor's degree in finance in 2017. He also holds two   degrees from the University of Pennsylvania, a MPA and a Master's in Law.

Career
Miller worked as a project management consultant for IBM before becoming a part-time realtor in Allentown. He was elected to the Allentown School Board in November 2019 and served as the board's vice president from 2020 to 2021.

Pennsylvania State Senate
During the 2021 redistricting process, Pennsylvania's 14th Senate District was relocated from Northeastern Pennsylvania to the Lehigh Valley. Miller narrowly won the 2022 Democratic primary for the open seat, defeating his closest competitor by only 48 votes. He went on to win the general election, defeating Republican Dean Browning. At the age of 28, Miller was the youngest person elected to the State Senate in 123 years.

References

External links
Campaign website

Living people
Democratic Party Pennsylvania state senators
Year of birth missing (living people)
21st-century American politicians

Politicians from Allentown, Pennsylvania
Pennsylvania State University alumni
University of Pennsylvania alumni